Miangaran or Mian Garan or Meyangaran may refer to:
 Miangaran, Hamadan
 Miangaran, Khuzestan
 Miangaran-e Olya, Khuzestan Province
 Miangaran-e Sofla, Khuzestan Province
 Miangaran, Lorestan
 Mian Garan, Lorestan